Gérard Chenuet (born 18 January 1945) is a French rower. He competed in the men's coxless four event at the 1972 Summer Olympics.

References

1945 births
Living people
French male rowers
Olympic rowers of France
Rowers at the 1972 Summer Olympics
Place of birth missing (living people)